Madonna del Prato may refer to:
Madonna del Prato (Bellini)
Madonna del Prato (Raphael)